Tomasz Pirawski (1564 – 30 Jul 1625) (Ukrainian: Томаш Піравський) was a Roman Catholic prelate who served as Auxiliary Bishop of Lviv (1617–1625) and Titular Bishop of Nicopolis in Epiro (1617–1625).

Biography
Tomasz Pirawski was born in 1564 in Kazimierz, Poland. On 13 Nov 1617, he was appointed during the papacy of Pope Paul V as Auxiliary Bishop of Lviv and Titular Bishop of  Nicopolis in Epiro. On 27 May 1618, he was consecrated bishop by Jan Andrzej Próchnicki, Archbishop of Lviv, with Stanisław Sieciński, Bishop of Przemyśl, and Stanisław Udrzycki, Titular Bishop of Argos and Auxiliary Bishop of Lutsk, serving as co-consecrators. He served as Auxiliary Bishop of Lviv until his death in 30 Jul 1625.

References

External links and additional sources
 (for Chronology of Bishops) 
 (for Chronology of Bishops)  
 (for Chronology of Bishops) 

17th-century Roman Catholic bishops in the Polish–Lithuanian Commonwealth
Bishops appointed by Pope Paul V
1564 births
1625 deaths
Clergy from Kraków